Stand Your Ground is an American hardcore band, and they primarily play a version of hardcore punk, with a more melodic hardcore style. They come from Kingsport, Tennessee. The band started making music in 2007. Their first studio album, Despondeseas, was released by Rite of Passage Music, in 2011.

Background
Stand Your Ground is a Christian hardcore band from Kingsport, Tennessee, where they formed in 2007, while they play a melodic hardcore style of music. Their members are lead vocalist, Brandi Pillow, guitarists, Micah Messamore and Daniel Taylor, bassist, Jonathan Taylor, and drummer, Tyler Domingues.

Music history
The band commenced as a musical entity in 2007, with their first studio album, Despondeseas, being released on August 30, 2011, by Rite of Passage music.

Members
Current members
 Brandi Pillow - vocals
 Micah Messamore - guitar
 Daniel Taylor - guitar
 Jonathan Taylor - bass
 Tyler Domingues - drums

Discography
Studio albums
 Despondeseas (August 30, 2011, Rite of Passage)

References

External links
Facebook page

Christian hardcore musical groups
Christian rock groups from Tennessee
Punk rock groups from Tennessee
2007 establishments in Tennessee
Musical groups established in 2007